Abraham Shek Lai-him GBS JP or Abraham Razack (born Razack Ebrahim Abdul; 24 June 1945) is a former member of the Legislative Council of Hong Kong (Legco), representing the real estate and construction industry in a functional constituency seat. He is a member of the political grouping Business and Professionals Alliance for Hong Kong in Legco. He graduated from the University of Sydney in Australia.

Razack is a businessman and former chief executive of the Land Development Corporation (now Urban Renewal Authority). He is a director of numerous large corporates, including China Resources Cement Holdings Ltd.

Political stance
Long a staunch pro-Beijing supporter of the Hong Kong Government, Shek surprised observers in October 2019 by siding with protestors in calling for an independent inquiry into police suppression of the then widespread pro-democracy protests, and in criticising the government's failure to recognise the need to address community concerns, particularly those among youth.

In March 2021, after FTU president Stanley Ng said that the government had allowed a "property hegemony" to allow developers to benefit greatly from increased property prices, Shek defended developers and said such "Cultural Revolution-style" criticism of developers would not fix the housing issues.

In April 2021, Shek opposed a bill that would introduce a vacancy tax on new units that were built but not sold after 12 months, a tax that would punish developers for leaving empty units unsold or unlet.

Positions held
Chairman, Public Accounts Committee, Legislative Council of HKSAR  since October 2012,
Chairman, English Schools Foundation since May 2015
Honorary Fellow of The Education University of Hong Kong
Honorary Fellow of The University of Hong Kong
Honorary Fellow of The Hong Kong University of Science and Technology
Honorary Fellow of Lingnan University (Hong Kong)

References

1945 births
Living people
Macau emigrants to Hong Kong
Hong Kong businesspeople
MTR Corporation
University of Sydney alumni
Professional Forum politicians
Business and Professionals Alliance for Hong Kong politicians
HK LegCo Members 2000–2004
HK LegCo Members 2004–2008
HK LegCo Members 2008–2012
HK LegCo Members 2012–2016
HK LegCo Members 2016–2021
Recipients of the Silver Bauhinia Star